Suzanna Sheed (born 14 March 1954) is an Australian politician. She was an independent member of the Victorian Legislative Assembly from the 2014 state election until 2022, representing the electorate of Shepparton.

Personal life 
Sheed has been a Shepparton resident for 35 years, and is a small business owner.

References

External links

 Parliamentary voting record of Suzanna Sheed at Victorian Parliament Tracker

1954 births
Living people
Members of the Victorian Legislative Assembly
Independent members of the Parliament of Victoria
20th-century Australian lawyers
Melbourne Law School alumni
People from Shepparton
People from the Riverina
21st-century Australian politicians
Women members of the Victorian Legislative Assembly
Australian women lawyers
21st-century Australian lawyers
21st-century Australian women politicians